The women's 78 kg competition at the 2016 European Judo Championships was held on 23 April at the TatNeft Arena.

Results

Finals

Repechage

Top half

Bottom half

References

External links
 

W78
European Judo Championships Women's Half Heavyweight
European W78